This is a list of Arkansas state high school baseball championships sanctioned by the Arkansas Activities Association.

Listings include champions at each classification level based on size (largest classification is listed first).  Early years of high school baseball were limited to a single state championship. High school baseball is a spring sport.

List of Arkansas state high school baseball state champions 

 2022 - Conway (4), Marion, Harrison (3), Harding Academy (6), Woodlawn (8), Taylor (6)
 2021 - Rogers, Van Buren, Valley View (2), Harding Academy (5), Woodlawn (7), Viola (4)
 2020 -  (No Championship due to COVID19 Pandemic)
 2019 - North Little Rock (3), Sheridan (2), Nashville (4), Benton Harmony Grove, Junction City (9), Viola (3) 
 2018 – Springdale Har-Ber, Greenwood, Sylvan Hills (8), Nashville (3), Harding Academy (4), Parker’s Chapel (4), Woodlawn (6)
 2017 – Sheridan (2), Vilonia (2), Nashville (2), Harding Academy (3), Spring Hill, Woodlawn (5)
 2016 – Bryant (4), Jonesboro (2), Magnolia (2), Shiloh Christian (4), Horatio (5), Woodlawn (4), Armorel (4)
 2015 – Bentonville (2), Sheridan, Harrison (2), Star City, Mayflower (2), Ouachita (2), Armorel (3)
 2014 – Bryant (3), Russellville (3), White Hall (3), Arkadelphia (2), Genoa Central (2), Junction City (8), South Side Bee Branch (2)
 2013 – Fayetteville (7), Jonesboro, Pulaski Academy (5), Arkadelphia, Harding Academy (2), Conway St. Joseph, Taylor (5)
 2012 – Bryant (2), El Dorado, White Hall (2), Shiloh Christian (3), Genoa Central, Woodlawn (3), Midland (2)
 2011 – Conway (3), Jacksonville (2), Magnolia, Shiloh Christian (2), Jessieville, Parkers Chapel (3), Armorel (2)
 2010 – Bryant, Lake Hamilton, Beebe, Shiloh Christian, Bauxite, Woodlawn (2), Trinity Christian
 2009 – Fayetteville (6), Benton, Central Arkansas Christian (6), Valley View (2), Elkins (2), McCrory, Taylor (4)
 2008 – Fayetteville (5), Sylvan Hills (7), Harrison, Valley View, Harding Academy, Woodlawn, Taylor (3)
 2007 – Fayetteville (4), Texarkana (5), Greene County Tech (3), Nashville, Horatio (4), Parkers Chapel (2), South Side Bee Branch
 2006 – Fayetteville (3), Greenwood (3), Elkins, Abundant Life, Armorel
 2005 – Sylvan Hills (6), Batesville (4), Warren, Horatio (3), Taylor (2)
 2004 – North Little Rock (2), Batesville, Central Arkansas Christian (5), Junction City (7), Taylor
 2003 – Fayetteville (2), Sylvan Hills (5), Pulaski Academy (4), Norphlet, Concord
 2002 – Bentonville, Alma, Pulaski Academy (3), Parkers Chapel, Fort Smith Christian
 2001 – Russellville (2), Malvern (2), Booneville, Lavaca (2), Scranton
 2000 – Texarkana (4), Watson Chapel (4), Central Arkansas Christian (4), Horatio (2), Ouachita
 1999 – Mills University Studies (3), Greenwood (2), Fouke, Baptist, Viola (2)
 1998 – Springdale, Batesville (3), Vilonia, Smackover (2), Viola
 1997 – Mountain Home, Crossett, Huntsville, Horatio, Bradley
 1996 – North Little Rock, Watson Chapel (3), Greenbrier (2), Mayflower, Nemo Vista
 1995 – Pine Bluff (10), Batesville (2), Huntsville, Central Arkansas Christian (3), Mount Vernon–Enola
 1994 – Texarkana (3), Batesville, Pulaski Academy (2), Central Arkansas Christian (2), Stephens
 1993 – Russellville, Crossett, Mena, Pulaski Academy, Midland
 1992 – Pine Bluff (9), Malvern, Junction City (6), Clay County Central, Tuckerman
 1991 – Watson Chapel (2), Clinton, Smackover
 1990 – Mills University Studies (2), Gosnell, Central Arkansas Christian 
 1989 – Conway (2), Junction City (5), Pea Ridge
 1988 – Watson Chapel, Clarksville (3)
 1987 – Jacksonville, Ridgecrest
 1986 – Pine Bluff (8), Lavaca
 1985 – Pine Bluff (7), Farmington
 1984 – Pine Bluff (6), Greenbrier
 1983 – Pine Bluff (5), Paragould Oak Grove
 1982 – Texarkana (2), West Fork
 1981 – Sylvan Hills (4), Junction City (4)
 1980 – White Hall, Junction City (3)
 1979 – Pine Bluff (4), Highland
 1978 – Sylvan Hills (3), Mansfield
 1977 – Junction City (2)
 1976 – Texarkana
 1975 – Mills University Studies
 1974 – Sylvan Hills (2)
 1973 – Pine Bluff (3)
 1972 – Junction City
 1971 – Little Rock Catholic (2)
 1970 – Little Rock Catholic
 1969 – Lonoke
 1968 – Fort Smith St. Annes (2)
 1967 – Fort Smith St. Annes
 1966 – Greenwood
 1965 – Sylvan Hills
 1964 – Greene County Tech (2)
 1963 – Bay
 1962 – Greene County Tech
 1961 – Pine Bluff (2)
 1960 – Fayetteville
 1959 – Pine Bluff
 1958 – Mountainburg (2)
 1957 – Mountainburg
 1956 – Clarksville (2)
 1955 – Clarksville
 1911 – Conway

Most state championships

See also 

 Arkansas Activities Association
 Billy Bock
 List of high schools in Arkansas

References 

https://scorebooklive.com/arkansas/baseball/brackets?season=2020-2021

External links 
 Arkansas Activities Association

high school
Arkansas
Baseball